Indra Putra Bin Mahayuddin  (born 2 September 1981) is a Malaysian professional footballer who plays for Malaysia Super League club Kelantan United. He is the all-time highest goalscorer of the Malaysia Super League. He is a versatile forward, who can operate as a striker or a winger.

Club career

Beginnings with Perak, Pahang and Selangor
Indra Putra has played in the Perak Academy when he was a teenager. He then was promoted to the senior team in 2002, helping Perak to clinch the Malaysian Premier One League in 2002 and 2003. Then, in 2004, Indra Putra Mahayuddin moved to Pahang in a high-profile transfer. There, Indra helped Pahang to win the inaugural edition of the rebranded Malaysian Super League in his first season.

Indra Putra Mahayuddin was described as the best Malaysian football player in his generation by former Perak's coach Steve Darby. He was the 2004 Malaysian Super League season top goalscorer with 15 goals from 21 games played. He remains, until this day, the last Malaysian football player to win that accolade.

He joined Selangor for the 2008 season, after his contract with Pahang expired.

Kelantan
During 2009 season, Indra Putra joined Kelantan and were partnered upfront by his former teammate in Perak Khalid Jamlus. On 18 April 2009, he was the villain among the Negeri Sembilan supporters after stamping on Negeri's defender, Rahman Zabul. Amazingly, he escaped the red card. He was part of the Kelantan team that play in that year Malaysia FA Cup final against Selangor where Kelantan lost 3–1 on penalties his spot kick hit the bar which cost Kelantan the match. Kelantan suffered another setback when lost the 2009 Malaysia Cup final against Negeri Sembilan. Indra scored a consolation goal from the free kick. However, Indra was chosen as the most valuable player for the 2009 season. He was part of the Kelantan's 2010 Malaysia Cup winning team.

T-Team
Indra signed with Kuala Terengganu-based club, T-Team in 2011.

Second Stint with Kelantan
After one season with T-Team, Indra returned to Kelantan for the 2012 season. During the 2012 Malaysia Cup final at the Shah Alam Stadium, he scored an extra-time winner and clinched a dramatic 3–2 victory over ATM. During the season, he also help the team win the 2012 Super League and 2012 Malaysia FA Cup, completing the treble.

Felda United
Indra joined Felda United, who were just relegated to the Premier League, at the end of the 2013. He helped the club finish runners-up in the 2014 Malaysia Premier League, and the club was promoted straight back to the Malaysia Super League after only being in the second division for one season.

Third Stint with Kelantan
On 30 December 2015, Indra was officially announced as Kelantan new signing during a friendly match with PKNP by Kelantan FA President, Annuar Musa. He was released at the end of his contract.

Kuala Lumpur
On 3 December 2017, Indra signed a contract with newly promoted side Kuala Lumpur after being released by Kelantan. He scored his first goal in a 2–2 draw against Pahang FA. He then scored his second goal against his former club, Kelantan FA in a 4–2 defeat. On 27 April 2019 he scored 100 goal in Malaysian Super League against PKNS; his first goal was 21 February 2004 against Sabah FA.

International career
The right-footed player started represented Malaysia for the 2001 Sea Games in Kuala Lumpur, Malaysia.  After that, he joined national team in the FA Premier League Asia Cup 2003 and also in the 2002 Tiger Cup in Thailand, helping Malaysia national football team to a 4th-place finish.

In 2002, Indra was call up for an international friendly match against five times World Cup winners Brazil. He was selected as one of the first eleven to play against Brazilian stars such as Ronaldo and Barca's Ronaldinho.

He also been called up by Malaysia national football team coach Norizan Bakar for the AFC Asian Cup 2007 in July, co-hosting by 4 countries Thailand, Indonesia, Vietnam and Malaysia. In the competition, Indra Putra is the only Malaysian player to score a goal, against China, as Malaysia crashed out in the group stages having lost all group games.

Indra Putra also represented the Malaysia XI squad against Chelsea at Shah Alam Stadium on 29 July 2008. The Malaysia XI eventually lost 0–2.

He was unexpectedly recalled to Malaysia national team, after a long period of absence, for a match against Indonesia on 14 September 2014 by national coach Dollah Salleh. He entered the match as a substitute, which ended in a 2–0 loss to Malaysia.

Career statistics

Club

International

International goals

Honours

Club

Perak
 Liga Perdana 1: 2002, 2003

Pahang
 Malaysia Super League: 2004
 Malaysia FA Cup: 2006

Kelantan
 Malaysia Super League:2012
 Malaysia FA Cup: 2012, 2013
 Malaysia Cup: 2010, 2012

Kuala Lumpur City
 Malaysia Cup: 2021

International
 AFF Suzuki Cup Runners-up: 2014
 Pestabola Merdeka Runners-up: 2008
 Southeast Asian Games:  Silver 2001

Individual
 Malaysia Super League Golden Boot: 2004
 FAM Football Awards – Best Striker Award: 2009 – Kelantan FA
 FAM Football Awards – Most Valuable Players : 2009 – Kelantan FA

Records
 The first player to reach 100 goals in Malaysia Super League
All-time highest goalscorer in Malaysia Super League: 102 goals

References

External links

 Indra Putra Mahayuddin at SoccerPunter.com
 
 
 
 

1981 births
Living people
Malaysian footballers
People from Perak
Malaysia international footballers
Association football forwards
People from Ipoh
Kelantan FA players
Selangor FA players
Perak F.C. players
Sri Pahang FC players
Terengganu F.C. II players
Kuala Lumpur City F.C. players
Felda United F.C. players
2007 AFC Asian Cup players
Malaysia Super League players
Association football wingers
Footballers at the 2002 Asian Games
Malaysian people of Malay descent
Southeast Asian Games silver medalists for Malaysia
Southeast Asian Games bronze medalists for Malaysia
Southeast Asian Games medalists in football
Competitors at the 2003 Southeast Asian Games
Asian Games competitors for Malaysia